Kimjongilia is a documentary film directed by N.C. Heikin that tells the stories of North Korean prison camp survivors and escapees from the country. The film premiered at Sundance Film Festival in January 2009.

Contents
Life in North Korea is examined through interviews with North Korean defectors. Included are stories from people who served time in North Korean prisons, former military officers, and artists, among others.

The title is a reference to a variety of flower named after North Korean leader Kim Jong-il.

Reception
The film had only a limited theatrical run and received mixed reviews. Reviewers acknowledged the importance of Heikin's subject, but found her juxtaposition of shocking narratives with interpretive dances distracting.

Metacritic, gave the film a weighted average of 44/100, based on only four reviews. Rotten Tomatoes gave it a 60% rating out of 10 reviews.

See also
 Kimjongilia

References

External links 
 
 N.C. Heikin Blog
 

2009 films
American documentary films
Documentary films about human rights
Human rights abuses in North Korea
Documentary films about detention in North Korea
2000s American films